is a city located in Sorachi Subprefecture, Hokkaido, Japan.

As of April 30, 2017, the city has an estimated population of 8,612, with 5,030 households. The total area is 763.20 km². Hemmed in by mountains Yūbari stretches for 25 kilometers along a mountain valley.

The city is famous for the Yubari Melon and the Yubari International Fantastic Film Festival, which skipped a show in 2007 due to the city's financial crisis.It is also birth place of Mitsuharu Misawa.

History
The city was founded on April 1, 1943 as a coal mining town. When the mines were operating Yūbari had as many as 120,000 people. With the closing of the mines in the 1980s, an attempt was made to convert the economic base to tourism. Subsidies were obtained from the central government and huge debts incurred for the building of tourist attractions, but few visitors came. In 2007 the city was in the news due to bankruptcy and the refusal of the national government to bail it out. City services had been severely cut and its white elephant amusement park and museums were up for sale. The amusement park has begun to be demolished as of June 2008.

Roughly half of Yūbari's government officials resigned in March 2007 as part of an attempt to streamline the local fiscal situation. The majority of officials stepping down who responded to a survey conducted by Mainichi Shimbun say they "feel no sense of responsibility" for the city's financial problems.

Geography
 Mountain : Mount Yūbari
 River : Yūbari River

Climate

Education

High school
 Hokkaido Yubari High School
 Hokkaido Yubari Special High School

Junior high school
 Yubari Junior High School

Elementary school
 Yubari Elementary High School

Transportation

Rail
The central train station was Yūbari Station on the Yubari branch of the Sekishō Line, formerly operated by JR Hokkaido. However on March 31, 2019 the Yubari branch line closed after 127 years of operation
, requiring passengers from Yubari to take the bus service to Shin-Yūbari Station.

 Sekishō Line (Main Line) : Takinoue - Tomisato - Shin-Yūbari - (Kaede Passing Loop)
 Sekishō Line (Yūbari Branch Line - now closed): Shin-Yūbari - Numanosawa - Minami-Shimizusawa - Shimizusawa - Shikanotani - Yūbari

Road
 Dōtō Expressway : Yūbari IC

Bus
 Hokkaido Chuo Bus
 Yubari Tetsudo

Sister city
 Fushun, Liaoning, China (since April 1982)

See also
 Furano-Ashibetsu Prefectural Natural Park
 Ishikari coalfield
 Ōyūbari Dam

References

Further reading 
Kazama Kensuke. Kazama Kensuke shashinshū: Yūbari (風間健介写真集：夕張) / Kensuke Kazama Photographic Collection: Yubari. Sapporo: Jyuryousya, 2005. . A collection of Kensuke Kazama's black-and-white photographs of Yūbari and its mines after their closure. All text and captions in both Japanese and English.
 Toda Reiko. Yūbari tankōbushi (夕張炭坑節, Song of the Yūbari mines). Tokyo: Shobunsha, 1985. . Black-and-white photo documentary of the last five hundred days of mining in Yūbari, a period during which a disaster occurred.

External links

Official Website 

 
Cities in Hokkaido